Footloose may refer to:

 Footloose (1984 film), a musical film
 Footloose (1984 soundtrack)
 "Footloose" (song), performed by Kenny Loggins
 Footloose (2011 film), a remake of the 1984 film
 Footloose (2011 soundtrack)
 Footloose (musical), a 1998 stage adaptation of the film
 Footloose (professional wrestling), the tag team comprising Toshiaki Kawada and Hiromichi Fuyuki
 Footloose!, a 1963 album by jazz pianist Paul Bley
 Footloose (G.I. Joe), a fictional character in the G.I. Joe universe
 Footloose Industry, a term for industry that isn't limited by certain environmental or spatial concerns that limit other kinds of industries.